Vigor is a free-to-play online survival shooter game originally developed for the Xbox One by the Czech studio Bohemia Interactive. As of July 2020, it is also available on the Nintendo Switch. Initially released as an early access title in August 2018, the game was fully released on August 19, 2019. A PlayStation 4 and PlayStation 5 port was released on December 9, 2020.

Gameplay
Vigor is an online free-to-play survival shooter game set in post-apocalyptic Norway. The goal is to stay alive and upgrade an abandoned shelter that will protect the player against the harsh environment. Players called Outlanders must seek resources and better equipment during Encounters with other players, although fighting them is not required. Only care packages or self defense enforce the use of violence. Every Encounter has a map that shows all exit points to players, as well as Points of Interest (POIs), such as hideouts, outposts, houses, a radio tower, and a transformer station. The POIs can offer valuable resources to help players upgrade their Shelter and reach its maximum level. Doing so will generate more materials and food to use, as well as reduce the crafting time for weapons and consumables.

An important aspect of an Encounter is the airdrop. These are crates containing valuable loot such as weapons, blueprints, resources, weapon skins, and Crowns (in-game currency). These are dropped by a C-130 or AC-130, and signal that radiation will start appearing soon. The rarity of the airdrop can be upgraded in the game preparation phase using Crowns. The map shows the general location where the airdrop will happen, but there are options to change the location by using the Comm Station. Airdrops are not triggered by players and instead occur at a predetermined time. When a player picks up an airdrop, their location is immediately revealed on the map to enemy Outlanders. The Comm Station can also be used to buff or debuff the airdrop. For example, it can be buffed by adding extra loot and resources or debuffed by making it radioactive. A radioactive airdrop poisons the player that touches it with radiation, giving them little time to make it out alive.

In every Encounter, a radiation cloud sweeps the area after a certain amount of time. When this occurs, players have to be quick and evacuate before they die from radiation. If the player has the special consumable iodine, they can stay longer because of its protection.

If players survive the Encounter, anything they've looted will be added to their inventory. However, if they die, all of their loot will be lost, as well as any weapons or ammo brought with them.

Home base 
The player can do various things at their home base, such as:
 Target shooting and timed shooting
 Collecting resources from different stations, such as rat traps and boxes of herbs
 Crafting weapons, ammo, and consumables to add to their load-outs or stockpile
 Choosing cosmetics like emotes or clothing

As the base is upgraded, its interior and exterior visually change. Every level requires a certain amount of upgrades.

Most weapons have a selective fire feature, even if their real life counterpart doesn't feature it, like the M3 submachine gun. Weapons that don't have the feature usually are bolt action and semi-automatic only weapons, such as the Mosin Nagant or M21 rifle.

The player can edit their load-out with weapons crafted using parts found in loot if the player has the weapon plan or they can use one found in an encounter. There are four spaces for weapons, two primary weapons and two secondary. It is often recommended to bring only one weapon due to the fact that bringing multiple weapons and dying can prove expensive for the player in most cases, especially if good weapons are brought in to the Encounter. Several of the weapons (such as the Makarov PM or the M3 submachine gun) are very cheap to craft, making them good for quick, low risk loot runs.

Other modes 
 
From Season 4, Outlanders can enjoy multiple different game modes, such as Shootout or Elimination.

Shootout Mode 
A fast-paced solo combat where players spawn with randomized weapons, but can scour the map to find better weapons and take down other Outlanders. If players die, they will be respawned with a new weapon and ammo. Matches last 10 minutes and use a scoring system. The more Outlanders the players eliminate, the higher the score they get, with higher scoring players receiving better rewards.

Elimination Mode 
A 5v5 tactical, round-based team fight, where players work together to eliminate the opposing team or to capture the opposing team's flag. Similar to Shootout, there are 5 choosable loadouts, only available to one player of team at the start of each round. Players are not respawned upon dying and they will have to wait until the end of the round to do so. The first team to reach the score limit wins the match.

Seasons 
Each new season is intended to bring with it new weapons, consumables, and purchasable cosmetic items.

Associated with seasons are time-limited battle passes that reward players with new cosmetic items, weapons, and consumable blueprints should they reach certain levels in the battle pass. Alongside new cosmetic items, seasons can also bring additional gameplay elements.

Development
Bohemia Interactive announced Vigor on 11 June 2018 during E3. The game launched in Xbox Preview on July 31, 2018.

Vigor was in the Xbox Preview until August 19, 2019, when it was released as a free-to-play title on Gamescom. It was also featured in the Inside Xbox Show.

The Nintendo Switch version was announced in a Nintendo Direct on March 26, 2020. The closed beta ran from April 9 to 16 and the game was fully released on July 8, 2020.

The game was released on December 9, 2020, on PlayStation 4 and PlayStation 5. After a week, it was reported that over 1 million players had joined the game.

Reception

The game was played by more than 700,000 players during early access. After the game was released, it became one of top 20 most played Xbox One titles as it was played by over 1,200,000 players.

The game was nominated for 3 Czech Game of the Year Awards including categories Main Award, Best Technological Solution, and Free-to-play.

In 2019, the game was nominated for an award in the Technology category in the Central & Eastern European Game Awards (CEEGA).

References

External links

2019 video games
Alternate history video games
Bohemia Interactive games
Early access video games
First-person shooter multiplayer online games
Free-to-play video games
Loot shooters
Multiplayer and single-player video games
PlayStation 4 games
PlayStation 5 games
Survival video games
Tactical shooter video games
Third-person shooters
Video games developed in the Czech Republic
Xbox One games
Video games set in Norway
Nintendo Switch games
Unreal Engine games